Foxtail or fox tail may refer to:

Plants
 Foxtail (diaspore), the dry spikelet or spikelet cluster of some grasses
 Alopecurus, foxtail grasses - the scientific name literally means "fox tail"
 Bromus madritensis, foxtail brome
 Hordeum jubatum, foxtail barley
 Setaria, foxtail millets
 Acalypha hispida, chenille plant or fox tail
 Asparagus densiflorus, foxtail fern
 Lycopodium clavatum, foxtail clubmoss
 Wodyetia, foxtail palm
 Agave attenuata, an agave species also known as the Foxtail

Other uses
 Foxtail Peak, Antarctica
 Foxtail, a character in the animated series OK K.O.! Let's Be Heroes